The Wrekin Trust was a charity (Charity number: 262303) founded by Sir George Trevelyan in 1971, under the active encouragement of Air Marshal Victor Goddard.  Its stated purpose is non-sectarian spiritual education.  It aims to create "safe meeting spaces for connections, dialogue, learning and social action."  The Wrekin Trust is now closed.

References 

Spiritual organizations
Charities based in Worcestershire
Educational charities based in the United Kingdom
1971 establishments in England
Organizations established in 1971